Patton is an unincorporated community in Clark and Edgar counties, Illinois, United States.

References

Unincorporated communities in Clark County, Illinois
Unincorporated communities in Edgar County, Illinois
Unincorporated communities in Illinois